High Street railway station serves High Street in Glasgow, Scotland and the surrounding area, which includes Townhead, the Merchant City, as well the western fringes of Dennistoun and Calton. The station is managed by ScotRail and is served by trains on the North Clyde Line.  It is located in the eastern part of the city centre, with Strathclyde University, Glasgow Cathedral and Glasgow Royal Infirmary being major institutions located nearby.

History 
The first railway station in the area was College on the City of Glasgow Union Railway which closed with the opening of this station in 1866. The station took its current name at the beginning of 1914.

Plans 
As part of the proposed Crossrail Glasgow initiative, High Street station may be demolished and relocated.

Services

2008 

Sundays there is a half-hourly service westbound to Glasgow Queen Street and Helensburgh Central and eastbound to Airdrie.

2013 

The station has half-hourly services westbound to each of Helensburgh Central (limited stop), Balloch via  (stopping),  and Dalmuir via  (stopping) (8tph in all via Queen Street, Partick and Hyndland).  Eastbound there are 6tph to Airdrie, of which 4tph continue all the way to Edinburgh Waverley via  (two of these are limited stop, the others call at all intermediate stations).  There is also a half-hourly service to Springburn although this has now been extended to Cumbernauld station and also now runs on a Sunday.

On Sundays there is a half-hourly service to Helensburgh via Singer westbound and Edinburgh eastbound.

References

Notes

Sources

 
 

Railway stations in Glasgow
Former North British Railway stations
Railway stations in Great Britain opened in 1866
Railway stations in Great Britain closed in 1977
Railway stations in Great Britain opened in 1981
SPT railway stations
Railway stations served by ScotRail
1866 establishments in Scotland